The Maranhão gubernatorial election was held on 1 and 29 October 2006 to elect the Governor of Maranhão. The result was a victory for Jackson Lago, when defeated the Sarney oligarchy, when 40 years, Sarney was elected, but was repealed in March 2009, by the Superior Electoral Court.

Candidates 

 Roseana, PFL25João AlbertoMaranhão The Strength of the People47%
 Lago, PDT12Porto, PPSMaranhão's Liberation Front(PDT, PPS, PAN)34%
 Vidigal, PSB40FernandesThe People in Power(PSB, PT, PCdoB, PRB, PMN)14%
 Aderson, PSDB45FormigaPSDBUnlocking to Develop(PSDB)3%
 Others1%

Sarney defeated

Senator Sarney sad the defeat, that Lago defeated the daughter Roseana, but Lago supported Lula. PT supported Lago in second round. But Maranhão's Libertation Front, wins on second round, Roseana lost to Lago. But Lago compared Sarney to ACM.

References

2006 Brazilian gubernatorial elections
October 2006 events in South America
2006